This is a list of episodes for the CBS television series Doctor Doctor.

Series overview
<onlyinclude>

Episodes

Season 1 (1989)

Season 2 (1989–90)

Season 3 (1990–91)

References

External links
 
 

Lists of American comedy-drama television series episodes
Lists of American sitcom episodes